N-Dubz Christmas Party was the second United Kingdom tour by English hip hop trio, N-Dubz.

Background
The tour was originally to be a taster of their second studio album, "Against All Odds", but it was later revealed that the album would be released one day before the tour starts. The official album tour will be in 2010.

Supporting acts
Source
Esmee Denters
Master Shortie
Tinie Tempah
Jaya
Mz Bratt
Saint

Setlist
Intro / Strong Again
Shoulda Put Something On
I Need You
Playing with Fire
N-Dubz vs. NAA / Duku Man
You Better Not Waste My Time
I Swear
Love For My Slum
Feva Las Vegas
Secrets
Ouch (explicit)
Don't Get Nine
Papa Can You Hear Me?
Sex
Wouldn't You
Defeat You
Number 1 (N-Dubz version)
Work Work
The Man Who Can't Be Moved / Breakeven

The Clubland Live 3 part of the tour had a much smaller setlist, since N Dubz were only a semi-headlining act, with Cascada headlining the tour. The dates were 26 November to 6 December. The Setlist for Clubland Live 3 was:

 Video Intro
 N Dubz Band Intro
 Strong Agaian
 Papa Can You Hear Me
 Against All Odds Album Advert/Band Solo
 Number 1
 Playing with Fire
 I Need You

Tour dates
All the tours been played have been sell outs except for 17 November in Southend and 24 November in Cambridge. The Folkestone show was rescheduled and was made part of their next tour.

Halfway through the tour, the group semi-headlined the "Clubland Live 3" tour, with fellow label mates, Cascada, Headlining. 26 November to 6 December was the Clubland dates. Other acts on the tour included Skyla, Infectious, Agnes, Darren Styles, Ultrabeat, Breeze, Frisco, Flip n Fill, Alex K, Mini Viva and Cascada. It is thought that N Dubz were taken on tour with Clubland only due to being signed to AATW records, and that many fans mentioned on the clubland forum that a small set from them would have added variety to the show.

References

2009 concert tours